The New Orleans mayoral election of 1973 resulted in the reelection of Moon Landrieu to his second term as mayor of New Orleans.  The primary round of voting was held on November 10; no runoff was required.

The 1973 elections were the last municipal elections in New Orleans held using the closed primary system. In 1975, Louisiana Governor Edwin Edwards signed a bill which changed all elections, except those for president, to an open primary system where all candidates regardless of party run on the same ballot. If one candidate does not receive an absolute majority (defined as 50 percent plus one vote), the top two finishers contest a runoff election.

Results 
Primary, October 1

Sources 
 Orleans Parish Democratic Executive Committee. First and Second Democratic Primary Elections, 1973.

Mayoral elections in New Orleans
1973 Louisiana elections
New Orleans